is a Japanese former judoka. He competed in the men's half-heavyweight event at the 1972 Summer Olympics.

References

External links
 

1945 births
Living people
Japanese male judoka
Olympic judoka of Japan
Judoka at the 1972 Summer Olympics
Sportspeople from Hokkaido
20th-century Japanese people
21st-century Japanese people